Kornhuber is a German occupational surname for a farmer. Notable people with this name include:
Andreas Kornhuber (1824–1905), Austrian naturalist and paleontologist.
Hans Helmut Kornhuber (1928–2009), German neurologist and neurophysiologist
Johannes Kornhuber (born 1959), German psychiatrist and psychotherapist

References

German-language surnames
Occupational surnames
Surnames of Austrian origin